Küps is a municipality in the district of Kronach in Bavaria in Germany.

Industry
Brütting (1946)

References

Kronach (district)